Andenes Lighthouse is a coastal lighthouse in Andøy Municipality in Nordland county, Norway. It is located in the village of Andenes at the northern end of the island of Andøya in the Vesterålen archipelago.  It was established in 1859 and automated in 1978. The lighthouse was listed as a protected site in 1999.

The lighthouse emits a continuous white light with a more intense flash every 30 seconds. The light burns from August 10 until April 26 each year, but there is no light the rest of the year due to the midnight sun at this location. The lighthouse is managed by the nearby Andøy Museum , which offers guided tours during the summer season. As a result, this is the best known and most visited lighthouse of Norway's Arctic region.

See also

Lighthouses in Norway
List of lighthouses in Norway

References

External links
Norsk Fyrhistorisk Forening 

Lighthouses completed in 1859
Lighthouses in Nordland
Listed lighthouses in Norway
Andøy